El maleficio (English: The Curse) is a Mexican telenovela directed by Raúl Araiza produced by Ernesto Alonso for Televisa in 1983. The telenovela was so successful in 1983 that a sequel was made under the title of El maleficio 2: Los enviados del infierno in 1986.

Ernesto Alonso starred as the antagonistic protagonist and Jacqueline Andere starred as protagonist, while Humberto Zurita starred as antagonist. Norma Herrera, María Sorté and Carmen Montejo also co-starred.

Plot 
Beatriz is a respectable widow, who after the death of her husband, dedicated her life to raising her children, Vicky and Juanito, together with her mother-in-law Doña Emilia. Beatriz meets the powerful millionaire Enrique de Martino, who dazzles her with his attentions and agrees to marry him.

Beatriz's life and her children change dramatically when they move to Martino's Mansion, where they come into contact with Enrique's strange children: the perverse Jorge, the sweet but confused César and the enigmatic Raúl. Beatriz also discovers that her husband can be very mean and that he drove his first wife Nora into alcoholism. Meanwhile, Juanito discovers that he has paranormal powers that are awakened by coming into contact with the evil atmosphere that surrounds his stepfather.

Enrique is actually a sorcerer who has made his fortune thanks to the dark arts and frequently visits  witches in the city of Oaxaca, especially Teodora, who worships a diabolical entity whom he calls "Bael" and who manifests himself through a painting that Enrique jealously guards in his office. At the request of his brotherhood (mafia) led by an Italian based in New York, Luiggi, Enrique starts a mission to choose his successor, who he desires to be at least or even more evil that himself. After numerous tests, Jorge seems to be in the lead. But in some missions, he disobeys, generally driven by a very excessive personal ambition, which makes Enrique hesitate to give the succession to Jorge, but there is no other person so evil.

Roberto Ayala, Beatriz's husband, has not actually died and reappears in her life pretending to be his twin Ricardo, whom the brotherhood had actually murdered. Roberto is horrified to see the bad influence that De Martino has on his family. In the middle of it all, Jorge abuses Vicky and makes her pregnant. Enrique forces Vicky to marry Jorge, against the will of Beatriz and Jorge himself.

For all their evil, the brotherhood  hold a few ironically virtuous ideals. One of them being, "blood should never be denied" and since Jorge pretended not to know his son, he loses the probable line of succession in the group. Because of this, the worst is yet to happen. Enrique has set his evil sights on Juanito to become his successor.

Cast 
 
 Ernesto Alonso as Don Enrique de Martino
 Jacqueline Andere as Doña Beatriz de Martino
 Norma Herrera as Doña Nora Valdés de Martino
 Humberto Zurita as Jorge de Martino Valdés
 Carmen Montejo as Doña Emilia
 Sergio Jiménez as Raúl de Martino Valdés/Damián Juárez
 María Sorté as Patricia Lara
 Erika Buenfil as Virginia "Vicky" Ayala de Martino
 Emilia Carranza as María Reyna
 Gloria Mayo as Eva
 Arsenio Campos as Álvaro
 Sergio Goyri as César de Martino Valdés
 Rebecca Jones as Ruth Reyna
 Eduardo Yáñez as Diego Flores
 Alba Nydia Díaz as Sara
 Alfredo Leal as Ricardo/Roberto
 Jorge del Campo as Felipe Reyna
 Alfonso Meza as Lt. Larios
 Patricia Reyes Spíndola as Teodora Carlos Bracho as Pedro Jiménez Gina Romand as Alicia Armando Araiza as Juan "Juanito" de Martino Ana Patricia Rojo as Liliana Mónica Martell as Alma Bauer Raquel Olmedo as Yuliana Pietri Héctor Sáez as Joao Nerina Ferrer as Lorena de la Garza Barbara Hermen as Lourdes "Lulú"
 Guillermo Aguilar as Meyer
 Malena Doria as Soledad
 Angélica Chain as Cinthia

Awards

References

External links 

1983 telenovelas
Mexican horror fiction television series
Mexican telenovelas
1983 Mexican television series debuts
1984 Mexican television series endings
Spanish-language telenovelas
Television shows set in Mexico
Televisa telenovelas